Javadiyeh (also Romanized as Javādīyeh; also known as Deh-e Kāshmarī) is a village in Montazeriyeh Rural District, in the Central District of Tabas County, South Khorasan Province, Iran. At the 2006 census, its population was 54, in 15 families.

References 

Populated places in Tabas County